Bangladesh's military history is intertwined with the history of a larger region, including present-day India, Pakistan, Nepal, Bhutan and Myanmar. The country was historically part of Bengal– a major power in South Asia and Southeast Asia.

Muslims brought new military technology to the region after the 12th century. According to João de Barros, Bengal enjoyed military supremacy over Arakan and Tripura due to good artillery. Its forces possessed large guns and cannons. It was also a major exporter of gunpowder and saltpeter to Europe. Bengal had a cosmopolitan military, including Muslims, Hindus, Buddhists and mercenaries from Africa, Central and West Asia. The Bengal Sultanate was a powerful kingdom between the 14th and 15th centuries. Bengal became an integral part of the Mughal Empire in the 16th century. The Mughal Army built fortifications across the region and expelled Arakanese and Portuguese pirates from the northeastern coastline of the Bay of Bengal. Throughout the late medieval and early modern periods, Bengal was notable for its navy and shipbuilding. Its shipyards produced ships for the Mughal, Ottoman and British navies.

A Bengal Army was established by the British East India Company in 1756, including native and European infantry. The native infantry included Bengalis, Punjabis and Gurkhas. The Bengal Army was merged into the British Indian Army after the Indian Rebellion of 1857. The British Indian Army participated in World War I and World War II. Bengali veterans of the Burma Campaign served in the Pakistan Armed Forces after the partition of India. Amid the Bangladesh Liberation War and a genocide by West Pakistan in 1971, the Bangladeshi military was formed by defecting regiments in East Pakistan, led by the East Bengal Regiment. The guerrilla Mukti Bahini played an important role during the war of independence. In the late 1970s and 1980s, the Bangladeshi military saw several insurrections as the country endured dictatorship. Since the restoration of parliamentary democracy in 1991, the Bangladesh Armed Forces have been subordinate to the civilian governments, including political and technocratic governments.

Since contributing forces to the First Gulf War in 1991, Bangladesh has become a major contributor in UN Peacekeeping. Bangladeshi peacekeepers have served in the Balkans, Africa, the Middle East and the Caribbean. Its recent domestic military history has focused on counter-insurgency, counter-terrorism and maritime security operations.

The 2008 Bangladesh–Myanmar naval standoff was a notable event of modern Bangladeshi military history.

Early history

Pre-Islamic Era
The early military history of the Indian subcontinent included Alexander's invasion of India, which was deterred by the might of Gangaridai Kingdom that was located in present-day Bangladesh, according to most historians. Prince Vijaya of the Vanga Kingdom led a naval expedition to conquer Sri Lanka. The Kalinga War was a notable event of the Mauryan Empire in the eastern Indian subcontinent. The ancient Indian armies included chariots.

Pala period
The Bengal region crystallized as an imperial power during the 8th-11th century Pala Empire. Many of the empire's cities are located in Bangladesh. The Pala military had a large war elephant cavalry, according to Arab historians. The Palas recruited mercenaries from different parts of the Indian subcontinent. Pala conquests extended across North India. The Palas were engaged in a struggle over the Kannauj Triangle with the Gurjara-Pratiharas and Rashtrakutas.

Sultanate period
The Muslim conquest of the Indian subcontinent heralded new military doctrines and hardware, including well-developed artillery. The Delhi Sultanate conquered Bengal in 1204 under the leadership of Bakhtiar Khilji, who later proceeded with an Islamic invasion of Tibet. In Bengal, the Delhi Sultanate displaced the Sena dynasty. Sultan Iwas Khilji (1212-1227) was responsible for founding the Bengal navy during the sultanate period. The chief of the admiralty had various responsibilities, including shipbuilding, transporting personnel, elephants and equipment; recruitment and collecting tolls at ghats. The sultanate period saw the settlement of many military officers and soldiers from North India, Central and West Asia and the Horn of Africa. The settlers included Rajputs and Pashtuns.

In the 14th century, Sultan Shamsuddin Firoz Shah and Hazrat Shah Jalal conquered Sylhet from Raja Gour Govinda; Sultan Fakhruddin Mubarak Shah conquered Chittagong from the Kingdom of Tripura. Shamsuddin Ilyas Shah became known as the Alexander of the eastern subcontinent after sacking Kathmandu, Varanasi and Cuttack.

Bengal Sultanate

The Bengal Sultanate was a medieval great power and conducted a number of notable campaigns, including the Bengal Sultanate-Delhi Sultanate War, the Bengal Sultanate-Jaunpur Sultanate War, the Reconquest of Arakan, the Bengal Sultanate-Kamata Kingdom War and the Bengal Sultanate-Kingdom of Mrauk U War of 1512-1516. The naval strength of Bengal was notable during the Ilyas Shahi dynasty and the Hussain Shahi dynasty.

Invasion of Sher Shah

Sher Shah Suri conquered Bengal in the 16th century and made it part of the Suri Empire. Sher Shah Suri also renovated the Grand Trunk Road around Sonargaon. His successors later revived the Bengal Sultanate.

Isa Khan's campaigns
After the Bengal Sultanate collapsed in the late 16th-century, the aristocrat Isa Khan led a confederation of zamindars (known as Baro-Bhuyan) to challenge the Mughal invasion of Bengal, often with naval battles on the Padma River, Meghna River and Jangalbari Fort in Egarasindhur. Isa Khan defeated Mughal governors Khan Jahan I in 1578, Shahbaz Khan in 1584 and Man Singh I in 1594. His son and successor Musa Khan continued to lead the confederation until succumbing to the Mughals led by Islam Khan I in 1610.

Mughal period

Bengal remained relatively stable and prosperous during the 17th century. A key challenge during the early Mughal period was piracy from the Kingdom of Mrauk U and the Portuguese settlement in Chittagong. In 1666, the Mughal Empire-Kingdom of Mrauk U War expelled the Arakanese and Portuguese from Chittagong. The Mughals also engaged in the Ahom-Mughal conflicts. During the 18th century, Bengal endured the invasions by the Maratha Army- the military of the Maratha Confederacy. It fell to the conquest of the British East India Company after the Battle of Plassey.

Forts
Mud forts were common in Bengal, such as the Ekdala Fort used in the Bengal Sultanate-Delhi Sultanate War. By the 17th century, the Mughals constructed a series of riverside fortifications in the Bengal delta. Some of the surviving forts include the following. 

Mahasthangarh
Idrakpur Fort
Sonakanda Fort
Hajiganj Fort
Lalbagh Fort
Jangalbari Fort

Artillery

The artillery was a vital part of the Bengal military. The Mughal emperor Babur saw it as a very effective part of the Bengal army. Portuguese historian João de Barros opined that the military supremacy of the Bengal army over that of Arakan and Tripura was due to the efficiency of its artillery. The artillery used cannons and guns of various sizes. The Bibi Mariam Cannon and the Jahan Kosha Cannon are examples of early modern Bengali artillery.

Bengal was a major exporter of gunpowder and saltpeter to Europe until the 19th century.

Mercenaries
Foreign mercenaries were an important part of the Bengal Sultanate army. Bengal recruited mercenaries from Abyssinia.

Shipbuilding

In the 14th century, Ibn Battuta reported of large fleets of war boats in the Bengal Sultanate. According to the traveler Frederick Caesar, Chittagong was a leading shipbuilding center in the 15th century. During the 17th century, the shipyards of Chittagong were reported to have built an entire fleet of warships for the Ottoman navy. During the Mughal Empire, Bengal was the leading producer ships in the subcontinent.

The British Royal Navy had many of its ships built in Chittagong, including vessels used in the Battle of Trafalgar.

Colonial military history

The Bengal Army was formed in 1765 by the British East India Company. The first native infantry was formed in 1757. In the 19th century, the Bengal Army was merged into the British Indian Army under the British Raj. The Royal Indian Navy was formed in 1830. The Royal Indian Air Force was formed in 1932. The Bangladesh Armed Forces were raised from the armed forces of the British Raj, which included the Bengal Regiment and major installations such as the Dhaka Cantonment, Chittagong Cantonment and the Bogra Cantonment.The following includes a list of conflicts which occurred within the territory of Bangladesh under British rule.  
Siege of Calcutta, attempt by the last Nawab of Bengal to recapture Fort William from the East India Company
Battle of Plassey- defection of Mir Jafar causes defeat of Siraj-ud-Daulah, the last independent Nawab of Bengal 
Anglo-Nepalese War- leads to Treaty of Sugali with Nepal and Treaty of Titalia (signed in Tetulia) with Sikkim 
First Anglo-Burmese War- Burmese forces invade Chittagong Division 
Indian Rebellion of 1857- includes revolt by the Bengal Army in Dhaka, Chittagong and Sylhet
Bhutan War- Bhutan loses control of Bengal Duars, including parts of Panchagarh District 
Burma Campaign- Allied Forces of World War II stationed in Chittagong, Comilla, Dhaka and Sylhet; Imperial Japanese Army Air Service bombs Chittagong

There was strong opposition to British involvement against the Turkish War of Independence, as both Mustafa Kemal Atatürk and the Ottoman caliphate enjoyed support in Bengal.

Eastern wing of Pakistan

With the partition of India on 15 August 1947 the territory constituting modern Bangladesh was partitioned from the province of Bengal as East Bengal, joining the newly created state of Pakistan. Ethnic and sectional discrimination hampered the role and function of the Pakistani military. Bengalis were under-represented in the Pakistan military. Officers of Bengali origin in the different wings of the armed forces made up just 5% of overall force by 1965. West Pakistanis believed that Bengalis were not "martially inclined" unlike Pashtuns and Punjabis; the "Martial Races" notion was dismissed as ridiculous and humiliating by Bengalis. Moreover, despite huge defence spending, East Pakistan received none of the benefits, such as contracts, purchasing and military support jobs. The Indo-Pakistani War of 1965 over Kashmir also highlighted the sense of military insecurity among Bengalis as only an under-strength infantry division and 15 combat aircraft without tank support were in East Pakistan to thwart any Indian retaliations during the conflict.

Khwaja Wasiuddin was the most senior Bengali officer in the Pakistani military.

Bangladesh Liberation War

Following the victory of the Awami League in the 1970 elections, then-president General Yahya Khan refused to appoint its leader Sheikh Mujibur Rahman as the prime minister and launched a brutal attack named Operation Searchlight on the civilians of the then East Pakistan, using the Pakistani army to repress political movements. Figures of people killed by Pakistani forces vary from a minimum of around 300,000 to a maximum of around 3 million. Responding to Mujib's call for rebellion, many students, workers and other civilians mutinied against Pakistan and raised the Mukti Bahini, a guerrilla force. Later on, many Bengali officers and units from Pakistan Army and East Pakistan Rifles mutinied against their West Pakistani counterparts and joined the Mukti bahini. On 17 April 1971, Muhammad Ataul Gani Osmani took oath as the commander-in-chief of Mukti bahini. While the war raged on, the necessity of a well-trained armed force was always felt. During the first Bangladesh Sector Commanders Conference, held from 11 to 17 July 1971, the Bangladesh Forces was formed from the revolting Bengali members of the Pakistan Army and EPR. In this historic conference the field command structure, sector reorganization, reinforcement, appointment of field commanders and tactics of warfare were decided upon and carried out. On 21 November 1971, the Bangladesh Forces was divided into three separate services as Bangladesh Army, Bangladesh Navy and Bangladesh Air Force.

The Bangladesh Forces received modest assistance from the Indian Government soon after the start of the war. On 3 December 1971, India-Pakistan war broke out and Indian troops enter Bangladesh allied with the Bangladesh Armed Forces. On 16 December 1971 the Pakistani Military force in Bangladesh surrender to a joint force of Indian and Bangladesh forces.

Post-independence

The newly formed Bangladeshi armed forces incorporated some of the units and guerrillas of the Mukti Bahini. Gen. Osmani, who had led the Mukti Bahini was appointed the General of the Bangladesh armed forces. For many years, there was active discrimination in favour of the inductees from the Mukti Bahini against those Bengali officers who had continued service in the Pakistani armed forces or had been detained in West Pakistan. A group of angered officers assassinated the president Sheikh Mujib on 15 August 1975 and established a regime with politician Khondaker Mostaq Ahmed as President of Bangladesh and new army chief Maj. Gen. Ziaur Rahman. The military itself was subject of divisions as Mujib's assassins were overthrown by the pro-Mujib Brig. Gen. Khaled Mosharraf on 3 November, who himself was soon overthrown by a socialist group of officers under Col. Abu Taher on 7 November who returned Ziaur Rahman to power—an event now called the Sipoy-Janata Biplob (Soldiers and People's Coup). Under the presidency of Ziaur Rahman, the military was reorganised to remove conflicts between rival factions and discontented cadre. However, Ziaur Rahman was himself overthrown in a 1981 coup attempt, and a year later, Lt. Gen. Hossain Mohammad Ershad took power from the elected government of president Abdus Sattar. The military remained the most important force in national politics under the regimes of Ziaur Rahman and later Hossain Mohammad Ershad until democracy was restored in 1991.

Modern period

Having relied primarily on Soviet Union for military aid, Bangladesh has also developed military ties with the People's Republic of China and the United States. The Bangladesh Army has been actively involved in United Nations Peace Support Operations (UNPSO). During the first Gulf War in 1991, the Bangladesh Army sent a 2,193 member team to monitor peace in Saudi Arabia and Kuwait. The Bangladesh Army also participated in peace keeping activities in Namibia, Cambodia, Somalia, Uganda, Rwanda, Mozambique, former Yugoslavia, Liberia, Haiti, Tajikistan, Western Sahara, Sierra Leone, Kosovo, Georgia, East Timor, Congo, Côte d'Ivoire and Ethiopia. As of October 2008, Bangladesh remained the second largest contributor with 9,800 troops in the UN Peacekeeping forces.

Until a peace accord was signed in 1997, the Bangladeshi military engaged in counterinsurgency operations in the Chittagong Hill Tracts fighting the Shanti Bahini separatist group. In 2001, Bangladeshi military units engaged in clashes with the Indian Border Security Force (BSF) along the northern border. Controversy also emerged over possible links maintained by the Bangladeshi military and intelligence agencies with Islamic terrorist groups and anti-India secessionist outfits. Several projects and schemes aiming to expand and modernize the Bangladeshi armed forces were launched by the government of former Prime Minister Begum Khaleda Zia.

Forces Goal 2030 was launched by the government of Prime Minister Sheikh Hasina to secure new equipment for the Bangladeshi military.

Bangladesh-Myanmar border
Standoffs have occasionally occurred at the Bangladesh-Myanmar border, including in 1991 and 2008. Most of the standoffs took place when Myanmar attempted to force Rohingyas into Bangladesh. In 2008, the two countries deployed warships after Myanmar attempted to explore a disputed Bay of Bengal seabed for oil and gas. The dispute was resolved at an international tribunal in 2012. Bangladesh and Myanmar have also conducted counter-insurgency operations on the border. 
2008 Bangladesh–Myanmar naval standoff
2015 Bangladesh-Arakan Army border clash

See also 

 History of Bengal
 List of wars involving Bangladesh
 Bangladesh Armed Forces

References